Desmundo is a 2002 Brazilian drama film by Alain Fresnot, based on the novel of the same name by Ana Miranda. The film is set in 1570, a period when orphan Portuguese girls were sent to marry the settlers' sons. This was done to prevent the Portuguese from having sons with the indigenous peoples and black people in order to keep the Christian marriage and a "pure" heritage. The film follows Oribela (Simone Spoladore) as she is sent from Portugal to Brazil to marry Francisco de Albuquerque (Osmar Prado).

Cast
Simone Spoladore as Oribela
Osmar Prado as Francisco de Albuquerque
Caco Ciocler as Ximeno Dias
Berta Zemel as Mrs Branca
Beatriz Segall as Mrs Brites
José Eduardo as governator
Débora Olivieri as Maria
José Rubens Chachá as João Couto
Cacá Rosset as Afonso Soares D'Aragão
Giovanna Borghi as Bernardinha
Laís Marques as Giralda
Arrigo Barnabé as musician

Production
In order to be more faithful to the period Desmundo is set, Fresnot—beyond of using clothing, furniture and costumes—decided that the characters would speak in archaic Portuguese. He said it was a "very hard decision", but felt it would seem shallow to use colloquial language in a historical film. Thus, the film has subtitles in contemporary Portuguese. Its filming took place in Ubatuba, São Paulo.

Reception
At the 35th Festival de Brasília, Desmundo won Best Score and Best Supporting Actress (Berta Zemel). It won Best Art Direction (Adrian Cooper and Chico Andrade), Best Costume Design (Marjorie Guelle) and Best Make Up (Vavá Torres) at the Grande Prêmio do Cinema Brasileiro.

References

External links
 

2002 films
Brazilian drama films
Brazilian historical films
Brazilian romance films
Films based on Brazilian novels
Films directed by Alain Fresnot
Films set in the 1570s
Films set in Brazil
Films shot in Ubatuba